The 1992 Southern Illinois Salukis football team was an American football team that represented Southern Illinois University (now known as Southern Illinois University Carbondale) in the Gateway Collegiate Athletic Conference (GCAC) during the 1992 NCAA Division I-AA football season.  Under forth-year head coach Bob Smith, the team compiled a 4–7 record (2–4 against conference opponents) and finish last place in the conference. The team played its home games at McAndrew Stadium in Carbondale, Illinois. 

On offense, the team set new school records with 56 touchdowns, 36.5 points per game, 295.9 rushing yards per game, and 459.7 yards of total offense per game. The team's statistical leaders included Scott Gabbert with 2,463 passing yards and Anthony Perry with 1,023 rushing yards. Junior Billy Swain set a new school record for career touchdown passes.

Schedule

References 

Southern Illinois
Southern Illinois Salukis football seasons
Southern Illinois Salukis football